Emma Nohrén (born 1980) is a Swedish politician. She was elected as Member of the Riksdag in September 2022. She represents the constituency of Gothenburg Municipality. She is affiliated with the Green Party.

She also served as Member of the Riksdag from 29 September 2014 to 24 September 2018. She represented the constituency of Västra Götaland County West.

References 

Living people
1980 births
Place of birth missing (living people)
21st-century Swedish politicians
21st-century Swedish women politicians
Members of the Riksdag 2014–2018
Members of the Riksdag 2022–2026
Members of the Riksdag from the Green Party
Women members of the Riksdag